This is a list of UNISOC (formerly Spreadtrum) processors for use in smartphones, tablets, laptops, smartwatches and other devices.

Feature phone processors

2G smartphone processors

3G smartphone processors

4G smartphone processors

5G smartphone processors

3G modems

4G modems

5G modems

Smart Wearables

WAN IoT

LAN IoT

Smart Display

References

ARM-based systems on chips